Bilal Tabti (born 7 June 1993) is an Algerian athlete specialising in the 3000 metres steeplechase. He placed 13th at the 2015 World Championships, but failed to reach the final at the 2016 Olympics.

Competition record

1Disqualified in the final

References

External links
 

1993 births
Living people
Algerian male middle-distance runners
Algerian male steeplechase runners
World Athletics Championships athletes for Algeria
Place of birth missing (living people)
Athletes (track and field) at the 2010 Summer Youth Olympics
Athletes (track and field) at the 2016 Summer Olympics
Olympic athletes of Algeria
Athletes (track and field) at the 2019 African Games
African Games competitors for Algeria
21st-century Algerian people
Athletes (track and field) at the 2022 Mediterranean Games
Mediterranean Games gold medalists for Algeria
Mediterranean Games gold medalists in athletics